Sampaio Corrêa Futebol Clube, commonly referred to as Sampaio Corrêa, is a Brazilian professional club based in São Luís, Maranhão founded on 25 March 1923. It competes in the Campeonato Brasileiro Série B, the second tier of Brazilian football, as well as in the Campeonato Maranhense, the top flight of the Maranhão state football league.

The club's colors are yellow, green and red. Sampaio Corrêa's nickname is Bolivianos (meaning Bolivians) because its colors are similar to the Bolivian ones. The club is also nicknamed Tricolor de Aço (meaning Steel Tricolour). The club's mascot is a shark.

It has a fierce rival with Moto Club de São Luís which is considered one of the biggest in Brazil.

Sampaio Corrêa is the top ranked team from Maranhão in CBF's national club ranking, at 32nd overall.

History
On March 25, 1923, the club was founded as Associação Sampaio Corrêa Futebol Clube. Abrahão Andrade was the Sampaio Corrêa's first president. The club is named after a seaplane called Sampaio Corrêa II, which visited the city of São Luís on December 12, 1922, and was commanded by two pilots, the Brazilian Euclides Pinto Martins and the American Walter Hinton. On April 26, 1925 the club played its first official match. Sampaio Corrêa beat Luso Brasileiro 1–0. The goal was scored by Lobo.

On December 17, 1972, the club won the Campeonato Brasileiro Second Division, after beating Campinense in the final. However, there was no promotion to the first division.

In 1997, the club won the Campeonato Brasileiro Third Division, after beating Francana 3–1 in the last match, and was promoted to the following year's Second Division. In 1998, Sampaio Corrêa won the Copa Norte, beating São Raimundo-AM in the final. In the same year, the club reached Copa CONMEBOL's semi-final round. Sampaio Corrêa beat América de Natal in the first round, Deportes Quindío of Colombia in the second round, and was eliminated by Santos in the semi-finals.

Stadium

Its home matches are usually played at Castelão stadium, which has a maximum capacity of 40,000 people.

Current squad
According to the official website.

First-team staff

Honours
 Campeonato Brasileiro Série B
 Winners (1): 1972

 Campeonato Brasileiro Série C
 Winners (1): 1997

 Campeonato Brasileiro Série D
 Winners (1): 2012

 Copa do Nordeste
 Winners (1): 2018

 Copa Norte
 Winners (1): 1998

 Campeonato Maranhense
 Winners (36): 1933, 1934, 1940, 1942, 1953, 1954, 1956, 1961, 1962, 1964, 1965, 1972, 1975, 1976, 1978, 1980, 1984, 1985, 1986, 1987, 1988, 1990, 1991, 1992, 1997, 1998, 2002, 2003, 2010, 2011, 2012, 2014, 2017, 2020, 2021, 2022

References

External links
Official website 

Sampaio Corrêa Futebol Clube
Association football clubs established in 1923
Sampaio Corrêa
São Luís, Maranhão
1923 establishments in Brazil
Campeonato Brasileiro Série B winners
Campeonato Brasileiro Série C winners
Campeonato Brasileiro Série D winners
Copa Norte winners